Mt. Crested Butte is a home rule municipality in Gunnison County, Colorado, United States. Mount Crested Butte is the home of the Crested Butte Mountain Resort. The population was 801 at the 2010 census. ZIP code 81225 serves post office boxes for Mount Crested Butte and for neighboring Crested Butte; mail must be addressed to Crested Butte.

Geography

The town sits at the northern and western base of Crested Butte, a  summit that is the site of the Crested Butte Mountain Resort.

Demographics

As of the census of 2000, there were 707 people, 323 households, and 114 families residing in the town. The racial makeup of the town was 97.31% White, 1.56% Native American, 0.28% from other races, and 0.85% from two or more races. Hispanic or Latino of any race were 3.54% of the population.

There were 323 households, out of which 11.8% had children under the age of 18 living with them, 31.6% were married couples living together, 2.8% had a female householder with no husband present, and 64.4% were non-families. 26.9% of all households were made up of individuals, and 1.2% had someone living alone who was 65 years of age or older. The average household size was 2.19 and the average family size was 2.55.

Age distribution was 9.3% under the age of 18, 17.3% from 18 to 24, 48.2% from 25 to 44, 21.5% from 45 to 64, and 3.7% who were 65 years of age or older. The median age was 31 years. For every 100 females, there were 160.9 males. For every 100 females age 18 and over, there were 156.4 males.

The median income for a household in the town was $48,864, and the median income for a family was $64,167. Males had a median income of $33,542 versus $32,188 for females. The per capita income for the town was $35,657. About 2.7% of families and 13.0% of the population were below the poverty line, including none of those under the age of eighteen or sixty-five or over.

See also

Outline of Colorado
Index of Colorado-related articles
State of Colorado
Colorado cities and towns
Colorado municipalities
Colorado counties
Gunnison County, Colorado
West Elk Mountains

References

External links
Town of Mt. Crested Butte official website
CDOT map of the Town of Mt. Crested Butte
Gunnison-Crested Butte Tourism Association
Crested Butte Resort
3dSkiMap of Crested Butte Mountain Resort

Towns in Gunnison County, Colorado
Towns in Colorado